Barezabad (also Romanized as Bārezābād; also known as Bārezābād Rāmjerd) is a village in Ramjerd-e Do Rural District, Dorudzan District, Marvdasht County, Fars Province, Iran. At the 2006 census, its population was 667, in 147 families.

References 

Populated places in Marvdasht County